Route nationale 27  (RN 27) is a secondary highway in Madagascar of 275 km, running from Ihosy to Farafangana. It crosses the regions of Ihorombe and Atsimo-Atsinanana.

Selected locations on route
(west to east)
Ihosy - intersection with Route nationale 7
Ivohibe (110 km)
Pic d'Ivohibe Reserve
Forrests of Fandriana-Vondrozo
Vondrozo (206 km)
Sahafatra
Farafangana (272 km) - intersection with Route nationale 12

See also
List of roads in Madagascar
Transport in Madagascar

References

Roads in Ihorombe
Roads in Atsimo-Atsinanana
Roads in Madagascar